Larry Butler (born July 10, 1952) is a former professional American football and Canadian football offensive lineman who played two season in the World Football League (WFL)for the 1974 New York Stars and 1975 Charlotte Hornets and six seasons in the Canadian Football League (CFL) for the Hamilton Tiger-Cats and the Winnipeg Blue Bombers. Butler attended Science Hill High School in Johnson City, Tennessee where he is a member of the Science Hill Sports Hall of Fame. He played college football at Appalachian State University where he was elected to the Athletics Hall of Fame in 1997. He won the CFL's Most Outstanding Offensive Lineman Award in 1981.

References

1952 births
Living people
American football offensive linemen
American players of Canadian football
Canadian football offensive linemen
Appalachian State Mountaineers football players
Charlotte Hornets (WFL) players
Hamilton Tiger-Cats players
New York Stars players
Winnipeg Blue Bombers players
People from Johnson City, Tennessee
Players of American football from Tennessee